Dork Diaries is a children's book series written and illustrated by Rachel Renée Russell.

The series, written in a diary format, uses drawings, doodles, and comic strips to chronicle the daily life of its 15-year-old adolescent protagonist, Nikki Maxwell.

Over 5 million copies of the Dork Diaries books are in print in the United States, and publishing rights have been sold in 42 countries with translation into 38 different languages.

Books

Side books 
 How to Dork Your Diary (October 8, 2011), presented as the third-and-half entry in the main series, is an activity book containing activities for the reader to write their own diary in the style of the books. It starts with the premise of Nikki losing her diary and then presenting her diary tips to make up for the loss.
 Dork Diaries OMG!: All About Me Diary! (October 8, 2013) is an activity book which offers a prompt for the reader to answer for each day of the year.

Audio books
Audio books for books 1 and 2 were released on September 28, 2010.

The Misadventures of Max Crumbly spinoff 
This spin-off series focuses on Maxwell "Max" Crumbly, the character introduced in Tales from a Not-So-Perfect Pet Sitter and, also written in diary format, his life in middle school.

Characters 

Nicole Julianne "Nikki" Maxwell
 Nikki is the main character of the series. At the beginning, she transfers to Westchester Country Day, a private school she can only afford because of a scholarship. She is a misfit kid who lives with a family she considers weird (namely her father, an exterminator who drives around a van that has a giant cockroach on top of it), and is bullied by Mackenzie and the CCPs (Cute, Cool, & Popular clique). She enjoys art and sketching and has a flair for it. She has two best friends, Chloe Garcia and Zoeysha "Zoey" Franklin, and shows interest in Brandon Roberts, a fellow student who loves animals and photography. She has brown hair that is usually in pigtails and she is left-handed. Her real name is Nicole, but she prefers being called Nikki.

Mackenzie Hollister
 The most popular girl at Westchester Country Day and the leader of the CCP (Cute, Cool, & Popular Clique.) She has a locker next to Nikki’s. Mackenzie is wealthy, spoiled, self-centered, and mean. She always wears top designer outfits, carries expensive bags, and wears a lot of lip gloss. She too has a crush on Brandon Roberts and tries to flirt with him, especially by twirling her hair, whenever possible. Mackenzie often bullies Nikki, calling her a dork, talking behind Nikki's back and trying to wreck her life with the help of her best friend, Jessica. She has blonde hair, blue eyes, and a little sister named Amanda, who is best friends with Nikki's sister, Brianna.

Chloe Christina Garcia
 Nikki’s best friend. Chloe is an avid reader and loves young adult romances. She is a self-proclaimed expert on guys and dating, and works in the library with Nikki and Zoey. She is described as somewhat prissy, but is a social outcast. Her parents own a software company. She is the fifth most unpopular girl at Westchester Country Day. Garcia is canonically Latina.

Zoeysha Ebony "Zoey" Franklin 
 Zoey is Nikki’s other best friend. She is super smart and also an avid reader, and is a self-proclaimed expert in psychology. She enjoys self-help books and often quotes them. Zoey works in the school library with Nikki and Chloe. Her mother is an attorney and her father is a record executive, and they are divorced. Zoey is the third most unpopular girl in the school. Due partly to the clarification that Zoey looks like Beyoncé in the second book, it is clear that she is African-American.

Brandon Roberts
 Nikki's and Mackenzie's crush. He is not as impressed by Mackenzie as everybody else, very obviously preferring Nikki. In the second book, he asks her to the dance (see above). In the seventh book, he kissed Nikki. In the books, he is described as "super cute" with wavy hair and blue eyes. He is shy around Nikki. Brandon is a photographer for Westchester Middle School's newspaper, and in Dork Diaries: Tales From a Not-So-Talented Pop Star, it is revealed Brandon plays the drums and joins Nikki's band, "Actually, I'm Not Sure Yet". His parents died sometime before the series and he lives with his grandparents. He works in an animal center named Fuzzy Friends and loves being with the puppies there. He hopes to be a veterinarian in the future. In the 12th book, he finally confessed to Nikki that he likes her a lot.

Brianna Lynn Maxwell 
 Nikki’s little 6-year-old sister. Brianna is afraid of the tooth fairy because Nikki told her the tooth fairy collects children's teeth to make dentures for old people. She is terrible at cooking, often causing a mess, but she enjoys it. In the 13th book, she starts a business of dog biscuits that she makes herself, and earns more than 500$ to pay for Nikki's birthday party. She has a friend named Miss Penelope (which is her own hand with a face drawn on it with an ink pen), and loves Princess Sugar Plum. She is best friends with Amanda Hollister, Mackenzie Hollister's younger sister. 

Jessica Hunter 
 The second highest-ranking CCPs at WCD and Mackenzie's best friend. She also dislikes Nikki, and bullies her alongside Mackenzie. Jessica has blonde hair and loves the color pink. Her last name (Hunter) was revealed in Dork Diaries 3 1/2: How to Dork Your Diary.

Violet Baker 
 The most popular girl out of the most unpopular people. When she signs up to run for chairperson of WCD's Halloween dance, she loses to MacKenzie Hollister and signs up for clean-up committee instead. When Mackenzie quits, Violet becomes head of the entertainment committee. She has a huge iTunes collection and is in a wheelchair. She appears in the second and third book. In Dork Diaries: Tales From a Not So Talented Pop Star, it is revealed Violet plays the piano. She is the pianist in Nikki's band, Actually, I'm Not Sure Yet.

 Theodore L. "Theo" Swagmire III 
 One of the unpopular boys in WCD and one of Nikki's friends. He is known for being the school nerd, and in Dork Diaries: Tales From a Not So Talented Pop Star, it is revealed he plays guitar. He is lead guitarist in Nikki's band, Actually, I'm Not Sure Yet. He hopes to one day go to Hogwarts. He had a big crush on Mackenzie, but now has a crush on Zoey Franklin because they went together as dates to the Sweetheart Dance in Dork Diaries: Tales From a Not-So Happy Heartbreaker.

Marcy Simms
 Nikki meets Marcy through her post as Miss-Know-It-All. Marcy sends an anonymous letter to Miss Know-It-All, saying that she's new, being bullied by some other girls, and can't find friends. Nikki tells her to hang in there, and keeps a look out for the new girl. She soon finds Marcy, and invites her to Brandon's birthday party, where Marcy has a great time. Marcy is Mackenzie's assistant fashion director for the newspaper, but is bullied by Mackenzie, and is deemed to be unfashionable by the latter. Marcy wears sports glasses and has short hair.

Marcus
 Marcus is a recurring character in the Dork Diaries series. He is the guitarist of Nikki's band, Actually, I'm Not Really Sure Yet. He appears in Dork Diaries: Tales From a Not-So Talented Pop Star and Dork Diaries: Tales From a Not-So Happy Heartbreaker. He appears to be a shy, nice, and thoughtful character in Dork Diaries and is also known as one of the smartest people in school along with Theodore L. Swagmire III. He also has a crush on Chloe Garcia, and the both of them went on a date at the Sweetheart Dance in Dork Diaries: Tales From a Not-So Happy Heartbreaker.

Tiffany Davenport
 Tiffany is the secondary antagonist of the Dork Diaries series. She is a student at North Hampton Hills International Academy, along with her BFFs, Hayley and Ava. She debuted in Dork Diaries: Tales from a Not-So Friendly Frenemy. She is Nikki's enemy, and Mackenzie's frenemy. Her mother found out in book 12 that she was a cyberbully, and forced her to do community service doing the summer (which Tiffany really disliked). André is her stepbrother.

André
 André is the stepbrother of Tiffany. He was introduced in Dork Diaries: Tales from a Not-So-Secret Crush Catastrophe as Nikki's pen pal. Nikki first believes that he is a girl named Andrea and accidentally reveals some embarrassing information to him as a result, but they both become friends. André somewhat rivaled Brandon Roberts for Nikki's affection at first, but he eventually understood that Nikki only saw him as a friend and backed off. He is also the first and only friend of Nikki to call her Nicole.

Reception, awards, and honors
Kirkus Reviews review of Tales from a Not-So-Fabulous Life praises the humor and ability to reflect upon early adolescence experiences well, saying "Nikki’s journey of self-discovery will appeal to preadolescent readers struggling to find their places in the world."

As of August 2012, the Dork Diaries series has spent 43 weeks on The New York Times Best Seller list in the Children's Series category.Book 1Dork Diaries has been on the New York Times Best Sellers list for 42 weeks  and the USA Today Best Sellers list for 7 weeks.  It was awarded the 2010 Children’s Choice Book of the Year Award for the 5th/6th grade division.  On February 10, 2011, it was nominated as Book of the Year by the Nickelodeon Kid's Choice Awards.Book 2Dork Diaries: Party Time has been on the New York Times Best Sellers list for 42 weeks  and the USA Today Best Sellers list for 12 weeks.  Books 1 and 2 appeared on The New York Times Best Seller list simultaneously for 17 weeks, with the former peaking at #4 and the latter at #2.Book 3Dork Diaries:Pop Star has been on the New York Times Best Sellers list for 28 weeks  and the USA Today Best Sellers list for 28 weeks.Book 3 1/2Dork Diaries: How To Dork Your Diary has been on the New York Times Best Sellers list for 14 weeks.

The eighth book, Tales of a Not-So-Happily Ever After, won the 2015 NAACP Image Award for Outstanding Literary Work – Children award.

Film adaptation
In March 2014, Summit Entertainment acquired the movie rights to the series. Karen Rosenfelt is in negotiations to produce.Bacle, Ariana. "Summits nabs rights to 'Dork Diaries' book series." Entertainment Weekly. Mar. 25, 2014

ReferencesNotes'

External links
 
 The Misadventures of Max Crumbly official website

Book series introduced in 2009
2009 children's books
2000s children's books
2010s children's books
Fictional diaries
Novels set in elementary and primary schools
Novels about bullying
Series of children's books
Aladdin Paperbacks books